General elections were held in Liberia on 1 May 1849, alongside a constitutional referendum. The result was a victory for incumbent President Joseph Jenkins Roberts.

References

Liberia
1849 in Liberia
Elections in Liberia
May 1849 events
Election and referendum articles with incomplete results